"Running Blind" is a song by American rock band Godsmack. Written and produced by frontman Sully Erna, it was the first single from the band's acoustic EP The Other Side.

Writing
During a Godsmack's acoustic live show in London in 2012, frontman Erna, before playing the song, explained:

Live performance
Godsmack debuted the song at The Tonight Show with Jay Leno on March 5, 2004.

Chart positions

Personnel
 Sully Erna – acoustic guitar, lead vocals, producer
 Tony Rombola – acoustic guitar, additional vocals
 Robbie Merrill – bass
 Shannon Larkin - drums

References

2004 singles
American hard rock songs
Godsmack songs
2004 songs
Songs written by Sully Erna
Republic Records singles